BizTalkRadio is a radio network in the United States.  Its programming focuses on the entrepreneur, small business owner and listener who wants to manage their family's assets.  Formerly known as the Business Talk Radio Network, BTR was purchased by Centerpost Limited in October 2013. Centerpost is a private media company that also owns BizTV, Youtoo America TV and Lifestyle Talk Radio Network. BizTalkRadio currently has over 300 radio stations that air its programming.

BizTalkRadio shows

Weekday programming
 Business Rockstars
 Investor's Edge
 The Big Biz Show
 The Frankie Boyer Show
 The Kristen Hagopian Show

Weekend programming
 Killer Innovations with Phil McKinney
 Garden America

External links
 Official Website
 Business TalkRadio Network Rebrands As BizTalkRadio

American radio networks